Lieberson is an Anglicized version of the German–Jewish surname Liebersohn. Notable people with the surname include:

Goddard Lieberson (1911–1977), American music industry executive
Lorraine Hunt Lieberson (1954–2006), American mezzo-soprano
Peter Lieberson (1946–2011), American classical composer
Samuel Lieberson (1881–1965), Odessa-born composer 
Sanford Lieberson (born 1936), American film producer
Stanley Lieberson (1933–2018), Canadian-born American sociologist